Rabak (Bashkir and ) is a rural locality (a selo) in Sandugachevsky Selsoviet, Yanaulsky District, Bashkortostan, Russia. The population was 366 as of 2010. There are 6 streets.

Geography 
Rabak is located 25 km northeast of Yanaul (the district's administrative centre) by road. Uchastok 3-go Goskonezavoda is the nearest rural locality.

References 

Rural localities in Yanaulsky District